Mark Bryan Wyland (October 27, 1946) is a U.S. Republican politician from the state of California, who represented the 38th District in the California State Senate.

Biography
Mark Wyland grew up in the city of Escondido.  As a Fulbright Scholar, he earned a B.A. in International Relations from Pomona College, where he is a current trustee, and an M.A. in political science from Columbia University.  After briefly working for the city of New York, he returned to Escondido and worked at Pine Tree Lumber Company, his family’s lumber and building materials business, where he worked his way up and eventually became a co-owner.

Mark Wyland began his first government service by sitting on the Escondido Union School District Board from 1997 to 2000.  In 2000, he was elected to the California State Assembly to represent the 74th Assembly District.  In 2006 he was elected to the  38th Senate District  California State Senate.  Senator Mark Wyland was reelected to the California State Senate in November 2010.

Senator Wyland has been honored with numerous awards, including Legislator of the Year by Tech America, the leading national technology trade association, for his effort to create jobs and promote the high-tech industry.

Currently, Senator Wyland serves on the Governmental Organization, Transportation, Insurance, and Business and Professions Committees. In addition, he is the ranking Republican on the Labor and Industrial Relations Committee.  Senator Wyland is also a member of the state’s Little Hoover Commission, which makes recommendations on government reform proposals, and the State Allocation Board, which allocates and oversees bond funding for school construction.

38th Senate District 

Senate District 38 comprises portions of Orange County and San Diego County.

North San Diego County - stretches along Interstate 5 from the horse track of Del Mar to the Marine Corps base at Camp Pendleton. Additional San Diego County cities include Bonsall, Carlsbad, Encinitas, Escondido, Fairbanks Ranch, Hidden Meadows, Oceanside, Rancho Santa Fe, San Diego (Rancho Bernardo, 4S Ranch, Rancho Penasquitos, Carmel Valley), San Marcos, Solana Beach, and Vista.

South Orange County - cities include San Clemente and San Juan Capistrano.

External links 
 Official Senate website
 Join California Mark Wyland

References 

1946 births
Businesspeople in timber
Republican Party California state senators
Columbia Graduate School of Arts and Sciences alumni
Republican Party members of the California State Assembly
Living people
People from Del Mar, California
People from Escondido, California
Pomona College alumni
Pomona College trustees
People from Carlsbad, California
21st-century American politicians